Zomicarpella is a genus of flowering plants in the family Araceae. It is native to Colombia, Peru and Brazil.  The leaves are hastate or sagittate. The chromosome number for Zomicarpella species is 2n=26. Additionally, the seeds have an endosperm.

Species
Zomicarpella amazonica Bogner - Amazonas State of northwestern Brazil
Zomicarpella maculata N.E.Br. - Colombia, Peru

References

Aroideae
Araceae genera
Flora of South America
Taxa named by N. E. Brown